Line 3 of Metrovia was inaugurated on May 4 of 2008. It connects the populous Neighborhood of Bastion Popular at the North of Guayaquil with downtown.

Stations

See also
Metrovia BRT System
Line 1 of Metrovia
Line 2 of Metrovia

Metrovia